The Competitiveness and Innovation Framework Programme (CIP) of the European Commission is meant to improve the competitiveness of European companies facing the challenges of globalization. The programme is mainly aimed at small and medium-sized enterprises (SMEs), which will receive support for innovation activities, better access to finance and business support services. It will run from 2007 to 2013.

The programme wants to encourage the usage of information and communications technologies (ICT), renewable energies and to promote energy efficiency.

History
The CIP is based on Decision No 1639/2006/EC of the European Parliament and of the Council of 24 October 2006 establishing a Competitiveness and Innovation Framework Programme (2007 to 2013).

CIP is complementary to the 7th Framework Programme (FP7) and is supposed to be "mutually-reinforcing [..], each designed to contribute to the success of the other."

The program COSME followed up CIP and runs 2014 to 2020.

Operational programmes
The CIP consists of three programmes:
 Entrepreneurship and Innovation Programme (EIP)
 Information Communication Technologies Policy support Programme (ICT PSP)
 Intelligent Energy Europe (IEE)
All three programmes are managed by the Executive Agency for Competitiveness and Innovation (EACI), an EU government body established by the European Commission to operate and oversee the various activities of CIP.

Entrepreneurship and Innovation Programme (EIP)
 
The European Commission indicates that EIP focuses to facilitate access to finance for the start-up and growth of SMEs and encourage investment in innovation activities and to create an environment favourable to SME cooperation, particularly in the field of cross-border cooperation, thereby promoting and assisting in all forms of innovation in enterprises.
The EIP will specifically support innovation efforts in the ecological sector. It also has the broader ambition to promote an entrepreneurship and innovation culture and related economic and administrative reform.

To help achieve these objectives the Commission has funded a number of actions. One of these is the formation of the Enterprise Europe Network, which started to form during January 2008. This new network has been established by integrating two former networks: the Euro Info Centres (EIC) and the Innovation Relay Centres (IRC). There are over 500 regional teams across Europe and beyond in 40 countries, making it the world's largest business and innovation support network. The objective of integrating the two networks is to offer businesses a one-stop-shop of integrated services under one roof to better assist companies in addressing their business and innovation need. The type of services offered by many of the regional teams comprises:

 business partnering such as supplier, distribution and join venture partner searches
 Online tools for tracking European public sector tenders
 Online facilities for assistance in finance and grant searches
 Advise on IPR and legal matters
 Advice on finance including grants, debt and risk
 Assist businesses in accessing research programmes and apply for R&D grants
 Advice and assistance on accessing EU programmes and funds
 Access to information on EU policies, regulations and support programmes
 Technology and R&D partnering
 Assistance for accessing Seventh Framework Programme (FP7)

Each of the Enterprise Europe Network Centres also offer a channel for passing feedback from businesses to the Commission on policies. All the Centres are also required to help engage businesses in EU policy-making by promoting consultations opened by the EC. The Network is essentially the front line for business and innovation support offered by Directorate General Enterprise and Industry, one of the various divisions or Directorate Generals comprising the European Commission.

In addition to the new Network, DG Enterprise & Industry have established other initiatives such as the European Investment Fund (EIF),  which provisions for venture capital aimed at SMEs - in particular high-tech early-stage companies.

See also
 Lisbon Strategy
 ManagEnergy
 Seventh Framework Programme

References

 
 FPCIP Consultation
 SME Circle's view on CIP
 Enterprise Europe Network Technology Offers and Requests Databased

External links
 Competitiveness and Innovation Framework Programme
 An example of innovation-support services provided within the ICT District in Piedmont

European Commission projects
Innovation organizations